Eron may refer to:

 Eron Riley (born 1987), American football wide receiver
 Eron Hodges, front office executive for the 2018 Purdue Boilermakers football team
 Leonard Eron (1920–2007), American psychologist
 Keith Van Eron (born 1955), American soccer goalkeeper
 Eron (footballer, born 1992), Eron Santos Lourenço, Brazilian football left-back
 Eron (footballer, born 1998), Eronildo dos Santos Rocha, Brazilian football forward